Centrolene huilensis is a species of frog in the family Centrolenidae. It is endemic to Colombia and only known from the region of its type locality near Isnos, on the Cordillera Central in the Huila Department.

Description
Males measure  in snout–vent length. Texture of dorsal skin of males is shagreen with spinules.

Habitat and conservation
Its natural habitats are sub-Andean forests (cloud forests). It occurs on vegetation beside water sources or in streams. Major threat to this species is habitat destruction.

References

huilensis
Amphibians of the Andes
Amphibians of Colombia
Endemic fauna of Colombia
Amphibians described in 1995
Taxa named by John Douglas Lynch
Taxonomy articles created by Polbot
Taxobox binomials not recognized by IUCN